Helle Fastrup  (6 November 1951 – 15 April 2022) was a Danish actress. She was awarded the Bodil Award for Best Actress in a Supporting Role in 1981.

Fastrup died of cancer at a hospice, aged 70. Her death was announced by a close friend.

Filmography 
  (1981)
  (1987)
 Ledsaget Udgang (2007)

References

External links 
 

1951 births
2022 deaths
Danish film actresses
Best Supporting Actress Bodil Award winners
Deaths from cancer in Denmark